Liu Yazhou (born 19 October 1952) is a retired general of the Chinese People's Liberation Army Air Force (PLAAF), and the political commissar of the PLA National Defence University from 2009 to 2017. He is known for his hawkish views on the defense and strategic posture he believes China should adopt.

Background and career 
Liu was born in 1952 in Fenghua, Ningbo, Zhejiang Province. Liu Yazhou has been described as a "princeling": his father was a senior military officer and his father-in-law was Li Xiannian, one of the Chinese Communist Party's Eight Immortals and one-time president of China. This privileged political pedigree has given him a greater platform for his views and opinions. His writings "have dazzled as well as upset his readers; supporters praise his boldness and insight, and detractors condemn his alleged militarism and demagoguery."

Liu has written novels and essays to both acclaim and controversy. As a prominent military figure in China, he is unusual for his outspoken views and apparent violation of a number of taboos on political discourse.

At the same time, his prolific writing may have partly contributed to his rise through the ranks. He leans on the sayings of former Chinese leaders to make indirect criticisms of Chinese Communist Party policies. Unlike many PLA officials, Liu has traveled much overseas, including serving as a visiting professor at Stanford University.

In 2010 Liu was promoted by deputy political commissar of the PLA Air Force, to political commissar of NDU, the premier academic and defense research institute in China. Prior to that Liu was the director of the political division of the Beijing Military Region, the political commissar of the Chengdu Military Region's Air Force, and the deputy political commissar of the PLA Air Force.

Comments on democracy and reform 
Liu Yazhou made headlines in the West in 2010 when he made a series of public remarks about democracy in China. "Democracy is the most urgent; without it there is no sustainable rise. Ideals of democracy are not restricted by national borders, or by historical ones," he said in August 2010, in an article in the Hong Kong magazine Phoenix Weekly.

Remarks like this led to Liu gaining a reputation as an "outspoken" and "reformist" general.

"'If a system fails to let its citizens breathe freely and release their creativity to the maximum extent, and fails to place those who best represent the system and its people into leadership positions, it is certain to perish," he wrote.

In an alleged internal speech in August 2013, Liu argues that reforms in China are now in "deep water" and that the country can no longer "cross the river by feeling for stones," as Party patriarch Deng Xiaoping put it in the early period of growth of the 1990s. Liu suggests that further reforms require political change, and ultimately even competitive elections.

Hawkish stance 
Liu's hawkishness can also differ from the more explicitly militarized claims of propaganda figures like Dai Xu and Zhang Zhaozhong. In an essay titled “The Grand National Strategy" written in the wake of the September 11 terrorist attacks, Liu argued against taking advantage of the fallout of the attack to attempt to conquer Taiwan. He advocated "diplomacy over fighting," and suggested the exploitation of Taiwan's political system over strongarm tactics.

For this, analyst Alfred Chan calls him a "nationalist and a realist."

Personal life
Liu's wife is Li Xiaolin, daughter of Li Xiannian, the third President of the People's Republic of China.

Selected works 
 Win in Air Supremacy (《赢在制空权》), 2014.
 Considerations on the War Dead in the First Sino-Japanese War (《甲午殇思》), 2014.

References 

Living people
1952 births
People's Liberation Army generals from Zhejiang
People's Liberation Army Air Force generals
Writers from Ningbo
Stanford University faculty
People's Republic of China essayists
Educators from Ningbo
Wuhan University alumni